Ajnale is a small village in the state of Maharashtra, India. It is located in the Dhule taluka of Dhule District in Maharashtra.

Location
Ajnale is located on the Maharashtra State Highway 10 (MH SH 10).

Demographics
As of 2001 census, Ajnale had a population of 871 with 436 males and 435 females. Males constitute 50% of the population and females 50%. Ajnale has an average literacy rate of 0%, lower than the national average of 59.5%. Male Literacy is 0%, and female literacy is 0%. In Ajnale, 7.57% of the population is under 6 years of age. Ajnale has an average birth rate of 0% and an average death rate of 0%.

There are total of 173 households in the village and the village border area is spread in the area of 1,612 hectares.

Administration
Ajnale has as Village Gram Panchayat for day-to-day administration. The District Zilla Panchayat headquarters is at Dhule and the Block Panchayat is also at Dhule.

Ajnale has no commercial banks, co-operative banks, agricultural credit societies, non-agricultural credit societies or other credit societies present within the village.

Transport

Rail 
Ajnale has no railway station of its own, the closest railway station is Dhule which is 14 mi (23 km) from the village.

Road
Ajnale is connected by the State Transport Buses that ply between Dhule, Kusumba & Malegaon.

Air
Ajnale has no airport of its own, the closest airport is at Dhule.

See also
 Dhule City
 Dhule District
 List of villages in Dhule District
 List of districts of Maharashtra
 Maharashtra

References 

 1. Census Of India: 2001: Population for Village Code 00158700
 2. Government of India: Ministry of Panchayati Raj

Villages in Dhule taluka
Villages in Dhule district